Ascoli Piceno (dialetto ascolano: Ascule) is a town and comune in the Marche region of Italy, capital of the province of the same name. Its population is 45,630 (November 2022) but the urban area of the city has more than 93,000.

Geography

The town lies at the confluence of the Tronto River and the small river Castellano and is surrounded on three sides by mountains. Two natural parks border the town, one on the northwestern flank (Parco Nazionale dei Monti Sibillini) and the other on the southern (Parco Nazionale dei Monti della Laga).
 
Ascoli has good rail connections to the Adriatic coast and the city of San Benedetto del Tronto, by highway to Porto d'Ascoli and by the Italian National Road 4 Salaria to Rome.

History
Ascoli was founded by an Italic population (Piceni) several centuries before Rome's founding on the important Via Salaria, the salt road that connected Latium with the salt production areas on the Adriatic coast. In 268 BC it became a civitas foederata, a "federated" city with nominal independence from Rome. In 91 BC, together with other cities in central Italy, it revolted against Rome, but in 89 BC was reconquered and destroyed by Pompeius Strabo in the Battle of Asculum. Its inhabitants acquired Roman citizenship following the war.

During the Middle Ages Ascoli was ravaged by the Ostrogoths and then by the Lombards of King Faroald (578). After nearly two centuries as part of the Lombard Duchy of Spoleto (593–789), Ascoli was ruled by the Franks through their vicars, but ultimately it was the bishops that gained influence and power over the city.

In 1189 a free republican municipality was established but internal strife led dramatically to the demise of civic values and freedom and to unfortunate ventures against neighboring enemies. This unstable situation opened the way to foreign dictatorships, like those of Galeotto I Malatesta (14th century), initially recruited as a mercenary (condottiero) in the war against Fermo, and Francesco Sforza. Sforza was ousted in 1482, but Ascoli was again compelled to submit to the Papal suzerainty. In 1860 it was annexed, together with Marche and Umbria, into the newly unified Kingdom of Italy.

Government

Main sights

Many of the buildings in the central historical part of the city are built using marble called travertino, a grey-hued stone extracted from the surrounding mountains. Its central Renaissance square, Piazza del Popolo ("People's Square") is surrounded by a number of buildings utilizing this stone, now often hosting open-air markets. Depending on the position of the Sun and the Moon, its color is constantly changing. A few blocks away, the Piazza Arringo, or piazza dell'Arengo, was the administrative and religious center of the town, surrounded by the Cathedral, the baptistery, the Bishop's residence, and the Palace of the Commune. According to traditional accounts, Ascoli Piceno once housed some two hundred towers in the Middle Ages: today some fifty can still be more evidently seen.

Main sights include:

Churches and convents
Cathedral of Sant'Emidio, dedicated to Saint Emygdius, houses an altarpiece by Carlo Crivelli.
Tempietto di Sant'Emidio alle Grotte
Tempietto di Sant'Emidio Rosso
San Francesco: gothic style church begun in 1258. The dome was completed in 1549. A monument to Pope Julius II is in the side portal, while the central portal is one of the finest examples of local travertine decoration. Adjacent to the church is the 16th-century Loggia dei Mercanti, in Bramantesque style of the Roman High Renaissance.
Convent of San Francesco: adjacent to the above-named church, of which two noteworthy cloisters remain today. It was once a prestigious center of culture, whose students included Pope Sixtus V.
Sant'Agostino: 14th century church built originally with a single nave, was enlarged with two aisles in the late 15th century. The rectangular façade has a 1547 portal similar to that of Sant'Emidio. The convent houses the town library, the Contemporary Art Gallery and an auditorium.
San Cristoforo is a Catholic baroque church located in the historic center of the city.
San Domenico: former convent, now school, has a Renaissance cloister with 17th-century frescoes.
Santa Maria Inter Vineas: 13th century church
San Pietro Martire: 13th century church with a 1523 side portal by Nicola Filotesio, known locally as Cola d'Amatrice. The interior contains the precious reliquary of the Holy Thorn, a gift of Philip IV of France.
San Tommaso: 1069 Romanesque-style church built with spolia from the neighboring Roman amphitheater.
San Vittore: Romanesque church documented from 996 with a low bell tower.
Edicola di Morelli: Monumental baroque niche attached to the exterior of the church of San Francesco at the Piazza del Popolo. The niche housed a venerated Madonna image, putatively designed by  Lazzaro Morelli, a disciple of Gianlorenzo Bernini.

Secular buildings

The Palazzo dei Capitani del Popolo ("Palace of the People's Captains"). Built in the 13th century connecting three pre-existing edifices, it was the seat of the podestà, the people's captains and, later, of the Papal governors. In the 15th century the southern side was enlarged, and, in 1520, a Mannerist façade was added in the rear side. In 1535 it underwent a general renovation, and in 1549 a new portal, with a monument of Pope Paul III, was added.
Palazzo dell'Arengo, located near the Cathedral
Palazzo Malaspina: Palace in Corso Mezzini, previous 14th-century structure reconstructed in the 16th century using designs attributed to architect Cola dell'Amatrice.  
Roman Solestà Bridge
Porta Gemina ("Twin Gate"): an ancient Roman gate from the 1st century BC, through which the Via Salaria entered the city. The ruins of the ancient theater are located nearby.
Porta Tufilla, a tower-like gate built in 1552–55. It is annexed to the Ponte Tufillo, a medieval bridge built in 1097 over the River Tronto.
Ponte di Cecco (Cecco Bridge), over the Castellano, recently identified of being of Roman Republican origin
Ponte Maggiore ("Great Bridge"), of medieval origin
Lombard Palace and the Ercolani Tower (11th-12th centuries)
Loggia dei Mercanti: a 16th-century portico annexed to the church of San Francesco. It was commissioned by the city's wool traders guild and finished in 1513.
Fortezza Pia, a fortress commanding the city rebuilt in 1560 by Pope Pius IV (whence the name).
Malatesta Fortress, in a site probably occupied by Roman baths. It was rebuilt by Galeotto I Malatesta, lord of Rimini, during the war against Fermo. The construction, used as a jail until 1978, was enlarged by Antonio da Sangallo the Younger in 1543.
Grotte dell'Annunziata ("Grottoes of the Annunciation"), a large portico with niches from the 2nd-1st centuries BC, whose original function is unknown (it has been suggested that they could be barracks or slaves dwellings, or a fortified palace)

In Castel Trosino, not far from the city, in 1893 a rare 6th-century Lombard necropolis was found.

Parks and gardens
 Giardino Botanico, Istituto Tecnico Agrario Statale "Celso Ulpiani", a botanical garden

Economy
Recent industrialization has brought to Ascoli several Italian and multinational companies (YKK, Manuli, Pfizer, Barilla) but the bulk of the economy is made up of small and medium-sized enterprises and by those providing professional services to the area. Agriculture is still important (wheat, olives, fruits).

Transport
Ascoli Piceno railway station, opened in 1886, is the southwestern terminus of the San Benedetto del Tronto–Ascoli Piceno railway, a branch of the Adriatic railway.

Education
The city is the administrative headquarters and teaching the School of Architecture and Design at the University of Camerino and the International School on Safety and Environmental Protection private university's Alma Mater Europaea.

Culture and sport
The main festivity is on the first Sunday in August. The historical parade with more than 1500 people dressed in Renaissance costume is held in celebration of Saint Emidio, protector of the city. The parade is followed by a tournament, called Quintana, in which six knights, each competing for one of the six neighborhoods in the city, ride the course one after the other trying to hit an effigy of an Arab warrior. Strength and ability are necessary for the knight to win the palio or grand prize.

The Castellano river is a site for swimming and bathing in summer.

Founded in 1898, Ascoli Calcio is the main football team in the city. It is one of the oldest teams in Italy and it played for 16 years in Serie A.

Gastronomy
Olive all'ascolana is a dish which originated from this locality. It is prepared from olives.

Territorial subdivision
Bivio Giustimana, Campolungo-villa sant'Antonio, Caprignano, Carpineto, Casa circondariale, Casalena, Casamurana, Case di Cioccio, Castel di Lama stazione, Castel Trosino, Cervara, Colle, Colle san Marco, Colloto, Colonna, Colonnata, Faiano, Funti, Giustimana, Il Palazzo, Lago, Lisciano, Lisciano di Colloto, Montadamo, Morignano, Mozzano, Oleificio Panichi, Palombare, Pedana, Piagge, Pianaccerro, Poggio di Bretta, Polesio, Ponte Pedana, Porchiano, Rosara, San Pietro, Santa Maria a Corte, Talvacchia, Taverna di mezzo, Trivigliano-villa Pagani, Tronzano, Valle Fiorana, Valle Senzana, Valli, Vena piccola, Venagrande, Villa S. Antonio.

Notable people

 Cecco d'Ascoli, 12th-century poet
 Domenico Balestrieri, 15th-century painter
 Francesco Bellini, entrepreneur
 Girolamo Buratti, 16th-century painter
 Carlo Crivelli, Renaissance painter
 Mattia Destro, footballer
 Romano Fenati, motorcycle road racer
 Dino Ferrari, 20th-century painter
 Detto Mariano, composer, arranger, pianist, record producer and music publisher.
 Stefano Travaglia, tennis player
 Dardust, musician
 Alice Pagani, actress, model, author

International relations

Ascoli Piceno is twinned with:
 Trier, Germany, since 1958
 Massy, France, since 1997
 Banská Bystrica, Slovakia, since 1998

See also
Asculum

References

External links

Official website 
ASCOLIDAVIVERE.it - Events, concerts, folklore, culture, entertainment
Ascoli Piceno Antique Market

 
Cities and towns in the Marche